Rinus Houtman (born 6 December 1942 in Maastricht) is a Dutch politician of the Reformed Political Party (SGP). He was mayor of Nieuw-Lekkerland from 2007 to 2012, and has been mayor of Leerdam since 2013.

References

1942 births
Living people
Mayors in South Holland
People from Nieuw-Lekkerland
Members of the Provincial Council of South Holland
Members of the Provincial-Executive of South Holland
Municipal councillors of Leiden
Politicians from Maastricht
Dutch Calvinist and Reformed Christians
Reformed Political Party politicians